William Ironside Groombridge was secretary of the English football club Gillingham (known for much of his tenure as New Brompton) from 1896 until 1923. Although the roles were not as clearly defined in the pre-war era, he is regarded as having carried out the responsibilities of manager from 1896 until 1906, from 1908 until 1919, and from 1922 until 1923.  His uncle, Thomas Saxton, was landlord of the Napier Arms pub where the club was formed in 1893.

References

Gillingham F.C. managers
English football managers
Year of birth missing
20th-century deaths
Year of death missing